The 2021 CONCACAF Nations League Finals was the final tournament of the 2019–20 edition of the CONCACAF Nations League, the inaugural season of the international football competition involving the men's national teams of the member associations of CONCACAF. The tournament was held in the United States from 3 to 6 June 2021, and was contested by the four group winners of Nations League A. The tournament consisted of two semi-finals, a third place play-off, and final to determine the inaugural champions of the CONCACAF Nations League.

The United States defeated Mexico 3–2 after extra time in the final to become the first champions of the CONCACAF Nations League.

Format
The Nations League Finals took place in June 2021 and was contested by the four group winners of League A.

The Nations League Finals was played in single-leg knockout matches, consisting of two semi-finals, a third place play-off, and a final. The semi-final pairings were determined by the group stage rankings (1 vs. 4 and 2 vs. 3), and the administrative home teams for the third place play-off and final were announced on 9 March 2020. All matches in the tournament utilised the goal-line technology and video assistant referee (VAR) systems.

In the Nations League Finals, if the scores were level at the end of normal time:
In the final, 30 minutes of extra time would be played. If the score was still level after extra time, the winners would be determined by a penalty shoot-out.
In the semi-finals and third place play-off, extra time was not played, and the winners were determined by a penalty shoot-out.

Qualified teams
The four group winners of League A qualified for the Nations League Finals.

Schedule
The tournament was originally to be held in Texas from 4 to 7 June 2020. However, the tournament was postponed on 3 April 2020, due to the COVID-19 pandemic in the United States. On 27 July 2020, CONCACAF announced that the Finals would be held in March 2021, though on 22 September 2020 CONCACAF announced that the tournament was again rescheduled until June 2021.

On 24 February 2021, CONCACAF confirmed the dates for the rescheduled CONCACAF Nations League Finals: 3 to 6 June 2021, with the venue and times to be released at a later date.

On 9 May 2021, CONCACAF confirmed the fixture dates and times.

Seeding

The four teams were ranked based on their results in the group stage to determine the semi-final matchups.

Venues
Initially, the competition was scheduled to be held in Texas, with the BBVA Stadium and NRG Stadium in Houston hosting the semi-final matches, and the AT&T Stadium in Arlington hosting the third place play-off and final. However, the planned venues were put into doubt following the tournament's suspension.

CONCACAF announced the city of Denver as the new hosts of the competition on 15 April 2021, with Empower Field at Mile High hosting the two semi-finals, third place play-off, and final.

Squads

Each national team had to submit an initial squad of forty players, five of whom had to be goalkeepers, at least 24 days before the opening match of the tournament. The final squads of 23 players (including three goalkeepers) had to be submitted by 27 May 2021, seven days prior to the opening match of the tournament. If a player became injured or ill severely enough to prevent his participation in the tournament no less than 24 hours before his team's first match, he was allowed to be replaced by another player.

Match officials
On 24 May 2021, CONCACAF announced the fourteen officials for the tournament.

Referees
 Reon Radix
 John Pitti
 Oshane Nation
 Bryan López
 Tristley Bassue

Assistant referees
 Iroots Appleton
 Jassett Kerr-Wilson
 Juan Tipaz
 Caleb Wales
 Zachari Zeegelaar

Video assistant referees
 Drew Fischer
 Erick Miranda
 Daneon Parchment
 Chris Penso

Bracket
In the semi-finals and third place game, extra time was not played if tied after regulation, and the match was decided by a penalty shoot-out. In the final, extra time was played if tied after regulation, and if still tied after extra time, the match was decided by a penalty shoot-out (Regulations Article 12.11).

All times are local, MDT (UTC−6).

Semi-finals

Honduras vs United States

Mexico vs Costa Rica

Third place play-off

Final

Statistics

Goalscorers

Awards
Best XI
CONCACAF announced the following squad as the best eleven of the finals after the conclusion of the tournament.

Weston McKennie was named MVP of the tournament, having scored a total of 4 goals in league and tournament play.

Notes

References

External links

Finals
June 2021 sports events in the United States
International association football competitions hosted by the United States
2021 in American soccer
2020–21 in Mexican football
Association football events postponed due to the COVID-19 pandemic
Nations League F